In dentistry, embrasures are V-shaped valleys between adjacent teeth. They provide a spill way for food to escape during chewing which essentially aids in the self-cleansing process. They also prevent food from being forced through the contact area which might cause food packing and periodontal pain and permit a slight amount of stimulation to the gingiva.

When two teeth in the same arch are in contact, their curvatures adjacent to the contact areas form spillway spaces which are known as embrasures.

See also
 Angularis Nigra ("black triangle")

References

 

Dental anatomy